On March 6, 2023, Richard Golden, a 38-year-old man from South Brunswick, New Jersey, was arrested after allegedly threatening to kill Mike Chitwood, the sheriff of Volusia County, Florida. Golden had allegedly stated to shoot Chitwood on the imageboard 4chan, which resulted in an investigation that ended up in his arrest. Chitwood had been the target of hate groups, primarily the Goyim Defense League (GDL).

Background 
In February 2023, antisemitic flyers were left around neighborhoods and under pedestrian bridges during the Daytona 500 in Daytona Beach, Florida. Mike Chitwood identified the perpetrators as the Goyim Defense League, an antisemitic hate group. In a press conference, Chitwood laid out information on the group and laid out arrest records of twelve members of the organization. Chitwood has experienced continuous harassment from the organization due to his stance on hate speech.

Incident 
On February 22, 2023, Golden allegedly made comments on 4chan, where users were discussing Chitwood's response to hate activity in Florida. Golden allegedly wrote to "Just shoot Chitwood in the head and murder him." The Central Florida Intelligence Exchange, a fusion center, flagged the post, and launched an investigation to identify the person behind the post. Investigators obtained a search warrant to launch a subpoena in order to acquire the IP address used to make the post, ultimately identifying Richard Golden.

Arrest 
On March 6, 2023, at 1:05 p.m. EST, the South Brunswick Police Department and the Middlesex County Prosecutors Office executed a search warrant at a home in Monmouth Junction, New Jersey, seizing electronic devices and arresting Richard Golden. Golden was living at the residence of his mother at the time of the arrest.

Accused 
Richard Golden, 38, was identified as the accused. The US Federal Bureau of Investigation (FBI) was told by his mother that he stays in his room, is unemployed and holds anti-government and anti-law enforcement views. He was charged with second-degree felony written threats to kill or injure. Golden is being held at the Middlesex County Corrections Center, waiting extradition to Volusia County, Florida with a bond of $100,000.

References 

2023 in New Jersey
Internet trolling